Edward Wentworth Dillon (15 February 1881 – 20 April 1941) was an English amateur sportsman in the early years of the 20th century. He played over 200 first-class cricket matches, mainly for Kent County Cricket Club between 1900 and 1913. Dillon captained Kent to three County Championship victories between 1909 and 1913, the only captain in the club history to lead the county to multiple championship titles. He also played rugby union for Blackheath and represented England in four international matches.

Early life and education
Dillon was born at Penge in what was then Kent, the fourth child of a shipbroker. He was educated at Abbey School, Beckenham and at Rugby School, where he topped the school batting averages in 1899 and 1900 and was described by Wisden as the best school batsman of the year. He earned his cricket Blue in his first year at Oxford University, appearing for both the University, whom he captained, and for Kent during his time as a student. Dillon also played rugby union for both Rugby and Oxford.

Cricket career
Dillon made his first-class cricket debut for London County Cricket Club in August 1900, making his Kent first-class debut later in the same month. He was predominantly a batsman, often opening the batting. Wisden described him as "very free in style" and being powerful when driving the ball. In his first-class career he scored over 10,000 runs, the majority for Kent. In 1905 and 1906 he averaged more than 40, making his highest score of 141 against Gloucestershire in 1905. He bowled leg-breaks occasionally, taking 74 first-class wickets.

Dillon captained Kent between 1909 and 1913 during which time the County won the County Championship in 1909, 1910 and 1913. He is the only Kent captain to have led the county to win the championship more than once. As an amateur his playing time was restricted by his business commitments as a shipbroker at times, including in 1909 when former club captain Jack Mason captained the Kent side in the final month of the season in Dillon's absence. He toured the West Indies with RA Bennett's XI in 1902 and America with Kent in 1903.

After World War I Dillon played in four first-class matches, including two in the County Championship for Kent in 1919. He made his final appearance for Kent in 1923 in another Championship match.

After Dillon's death in 1941, The Times cricket correspondent wrote:

Rugby union career
Dillon was a fine rugby union player, playing as a centre for Oxford University and Blackheath. He won four international caps for England, playing against Wales, Scotland and Ireland in the 1904 Home Nations Championship and against Wales in the 1905 Championship. He also represented Harlequins, Barbarians and Kent.

Military career and later life
Dillon enlisted in September 1914, being commissioned into the Royal West Kent Regiment in the early months of World War I, eventually reaching the rank of captain and serving as a company commander in the 2/4th battalion. He served during the war at Gallipoli, in the Senussi campaign in Egypt and in Palestine, where he took part in the First Battle of Gaza. Dillon was wounded during the Stalemate in Southern Palestine and was involved in the Southern Palestine Offensive and the Battle of Jerusalem in late 1917. He was transferred to the Economic Division in Cairo in late December 1917, serving there in the Intelligence Corps for the remainder of the war.

Dillon died in 1941 aged 60 at Totteridge in Hertfordshire.

References

External links 

1881 births
1941 deaths
Intelligence Corps officers
Kent cricketers
Kent cricket captains
Oxford University cricketers
Gentlemen cricketers
Blackheath F.C. players
English rugby union players
England international rugby union players
People educated at Rugby School
Alumni of University College, Oxford
Queen's Own Royal West Kent Regiment officers
British Army personnel of World War I
People from Penge
Marylebone Cricket Club cricketers
North v South cricketers
English cricketers
London County cricketers
Gentlemen of England cricketers
H. D. G. Leveson Gower's XI cricketers
P. F. Warner's XI cricketers
Military personnel from Kent
Rugby union players from Kent
R. A. Bennett's XI cricketers
Kent County RFU players